The Brass Rail may refer to:
The Brass Rail (Hoboken, New Jersey), a restaurant
The Brass Rail (Toronto), a strip club